The Serra das Torres Natural Monument is a natural monument in the state of Espírito Santo, Brazil.
It protects the peaks of a mountain range in the south of the state.

Location

The Serra das Torres Natural Monument is in the municipalities of Mimoso do Sul, Muqui and Atílio Vivacqua, Espírito Santo.
The monument covers the higher portions of the mountains in the three municipalities, dominated by rocky outcroppings and forest remnants.
Private ownership of land is allowed as long as its usage is compatible with the conservation objectives.

History

Discussion about creating the natural monument began in 2007.
Public consultations were held in December 2009.
The Serra das Torres State Natural Monument was created by state law 9.463 of 11 June 2010.
Objectives included preserving a site of great natural or scenic beauty, preserving geodiversity and the integrity of the rock formations of the Serra das Torres massif, protecting the remaining forests and preserving biodiversity, protecting springs and aquifers that contribute to the Itabapoana and Itapemirim rivers, increasing genetic connectivity between the forest remnants in the region, and promoting sustainable development, ecotourism, environmental education, scientific research.
It became part of the Central Atlantic Forest Ecological Corridor, created in 2002.

Notes

Sources

Natural monuments of Brazil
Protected areas of Espírito Santo
2010 establishments in Brazil